HC Metulla is an ice hockey team in Metulla, Israel. They play in the Israeli League, the top level of ice hockey in Israel.

History
The club was founded in 1996, and won the Israeli League in 1999 and 2011.

Also in 1999, Metulla participated in Group D of the 1999–2000 IIHF Continental Cup. They finished in 4th place with a 1 : 10 loss to Dunaferr SE, 1 : 16 loss to HK Acroni Jesenice, and a 0 : 13 loss to HK Sportina Bled.

Achievements
Israeli champion (1): 1999, 2011

Notable players

Eliezer Sherbatov (born 1991), Canadian-Israeli
 Daniel Spivak

External links
 HC Metulla on hockeyarenas.net

Metulla